Glamour Girl is a 1938 British comedy film directed by Arthur B. Woods and starring Gene Gerrard, Lesley Brook, Ross Landon, Betty Lynne and Leslie Weston.

It was made Teddington Studios as a quota quickie by the British subsidiary of Warner Bros.

The plot involved a commercial photographer leaving his job to become a painter, and using his secretary as a model.

It marked the last film appearance of American actor James Carew.

Cast
Dean Webster - 	Gene Gerrard
Connie Stevens - 	Lesley Brook
Taylor Brooks - 	Ross Landon
Vicki	- Betty Lynne
Murphy - 	Leslie Weston
Sir Raymond Bell - 	Dennis Arundell
J.J.Andex - 	Robert Rendel
Collins - 	James Carew
Arnold - 	Jimmy Godden

References

External links

1938 films
1938 comedy films
Films directed by Arthur B. Woods
British comedy films
Warner Bros. films
Films shot at Teddington Studios
Quota quickies
British black-and-white films
1930s English-language films
1930s British films